Župančiči is a small settlement in the City Municipality of Koper in the Littoral region of Slovenia.

Geography
Župančiči is located in a narrow valley above the right bank of the Rokava River. There are fertile tilled fields in the valley, and the surrounding slopes have pastures, meadows, and sparse woods.

Name
The name Župančiči is plural, presumably referring to former residents with the surname Župančič. The surname is derived from the common noun župan, referring to a local leader, and has given rise to other toponyms, such as Županje Njive. Locally, the village is known as Flegi.

References

External links

Župančiči on Geopedia

Populated places in the City Municipality of Koper